Bridge over Troubled Water is a 1970 studio album by Paul Desmond. It consists of songs recorded by Simon & Garfunkel and arranged by Don Sebesky.

Reception

Richard S. Ginell of AllMusic said that "Against the odds as determined by bopsters, Desmond finds something beautiful, wistful, and/or sly to say in each of these ten tunes, backed by Herbie Hancock's Rhodes electric piano and a set of ravishing, occasionally overstated (as in "America") orchestrations by Don Sebesky".

Track listing
All songs written by Paul Simon, except "Scarborough Fair/Canticle", a traditional ballad, arranged by Simon and Art Garfunkel.

"El Condor Pasa" – 3:05
"So Long, Frank Lloyd Wright" – 3:27
"The 59th Street Bridge Song (Feelin' Groovy)" – 5:11
"Mrs. Robinson" – 2:42
"Old Friends" – 3:54
"America" – 3:58
"For Emily, Whenever I May Find Her" – 4:03
"Scarborough Fair/Canticle" – 4:23
"Cecilia" – 2:14
"Bridge over Troubled Water" – 3:24

Personnel

Paul Desmond – alto saxophone
Herbie Hancock – electric piano
Ron Carter – double bass
Jerry Jemmott – Fender bass
Airto Moreira, Bill Lavorgna, João Palma – drums
Gene Bertoncini, Sam Brown – guitar
Don Sebesky – arranger

References

1970 albums
Paul Desmond albums
Tribute albums
Albums arranged by Don Sebesky
A&M Records albums
Simon & Garfunkel